The Mawson Formation is a geological formation in Antarctica, dating to roughly between 182 and 177 million years ago and covering the Toarcian stages of the Jurassic Period in the Mesozoic Era. Vertebrate remains are known from the formation. The Mawson Formation is the South Victoria Land equivalent of the Karoo Large Igneous Province in South Africa (including the upper Clarens Formation desertic interbeds), as well the Lonco Trapial Formation and the Cañadón Asfalto Formation of Argentina.

Geology 
The thin lacustrine interbeds of the Mawson Formation have received several names in literature, being known as either Carapace Sandstone or Carapace Formation, being a series of Freshwater environments developed during times when the Kirkpatrick Basalt stopped invading the zone. The lava flow deposits of the Kirkpatrick Basalt belong to the Ferrar Large Igneous Province, developed in a linear belt along the Transantarctic Mountains, from the Weddell Sea region to North Victoria Land, covering approx. 3,500 km in length. This event was linked with the  initial stages of the breakup of the Gondwanan part of Pangea, concretely with the rifting of East Antarctica and Southern Africa, developing a magmatic flow controlled by an Early Jurassic zone of extension related to a triple junction in the proto-Weddell Sea region at approximately 55°S. This eruptions phase includes the Dufek Intrusion, the Ferrar Dolerite sills and dikes, extrusive rocks consisting of pyroclastic strata, and the Kirkpatrick Basalt lava flows, with a total thickness variable, but exceeding 2 km in some places. This Volcanism is not limited to the Antarctica, as it was recorded also in Tasmania and New Zealand, suggesting that these area where connected back then.



Paleoenvironment 

The Mawson Formation was described originally subdivided in two sections, that where identified as separate units. This, is due to a clear differentiation of two kinds of deposits: the so-called "Mawson Tuffs", representing  lithified pyroclastic material and the "Carapace sandstones", alluvial/lacustrine, both deposited in a setting defined by Ballance and Watters (1971) as composed by  “shallow, northeast flowing, ephemeral streams on a subsiding alluvial plain”. Beyond alluvial settings, ancient lakes, with hydrothermal influence, where developed thanks to the relationships with the overliying Kirckpatrick Basalt. This deposits mark the know locally as "Mawson Time", a section of the sedimentological evolution of the Ferrar Range, where volcanic material deposited in Allan Hills and Coombs Hills, while the Carapace Sandstones hosted an alluvial plain that recovered all the volcanic detritus, being latter flooded and developing a lacustrine ecosystem.

The Formation includes two main locations: Carapace Nunatak in South Victoria Land, representing a deposit of interbeds dominated by sandstones of fluvial to lacustrine origin. The main outcrop of this location is notorious for the presence of a 37 m Hialoclastite, volcanic material accumulated, likely on a local lake of the same depth. This lake layers, called "Lake Carapace", host the only relatively complete fish remains recovered in the whole formation, and was likely feed by seasonal streams that brought the volcanic materials from sources located far away of the alluvial setting.  The "Lake Carapace" also shows temporal exposed paleosoils, with and without roots, as well with muds cracks, indicating seasonal drougths. This lacustrine-type deposit is also found on the second main fossiliferous outcrops of the formation, being in the Queen Alexandra Range in the Central Transantarctic Mountains.

Sedimentary interbeds deposited over lava flows of the Kirkpatrick Basalt during the Early Jurassic splitting of Gondwana represent unusual freshwater paleoenvironments, with hotter conditions that allow to the diversification of the microbes (Archea).

According to Barrett, "...the basalt-dominated Mawson Formation and tholeiitic flows (Kirkpatrick Basalt)...are included in the Ferrar Group."  The Mawson Formation consists of diamictites,  explosion breccias, and lahar flows, evidence of magma entering water-saturated sediments.  The Kirkpatrick Basalts (180 Ma) have interbedded lake sediments with plant and fish fossils.

Fossil content 
There abundant Fossils of microorganisms, as members of the group Archea and other who take advantage of the hydrothermal activity The Acuatic fauna, dominated by invertebrates, includes a diversity of species complete enough to establish Trophic chains: there are traces of feeding, including a coprolite of uncertain affinity with a fish scale, conchostracan valves with traces of possible biotic borings and palynological residues linked with Ostracodan valves.

Demospongiae

Crustacea

Insects 
Fossil insect wings not described to the genus level are known from the formation. The overall record of local insects include up to 50 specimens all recovered in lacustrine deposits.

Fish

Fungi

Palynology 
Mostly of the samples recovered at Carapace Nunantak are characterised by dominance of the Cheirolepidaceous Classopollis and Corollina. Two taxa, the Araucariaceous Callialasporites dampieri and the Pteridaceae Contignisporites cooksoni are also common palynological residues in local samples.

Megaflora 
One of the best preserved fossil flora of the Antarctic. Nearly all the floral remains where recovered from Siliclastic interbeds, being mostly of them Silidified.

See also 
 List of fossiliferous stratigraphic units in Antarctica
 Shafer Peak Formation
 Hanson Formation
 Shackleton Formation
 South Polar region of the Cretaceous
 Toarcian turnover
 Toarcian formations
Marne di Monte Serrone, Italy
 Calcare di Sogno, Italy
 Sachrang Formation, Austria
 Posidonia Shale, Lagerstätte in Germany
 Ciechocinek Formation, Germany and Poland
 Krempachy Marl Formation, Poland and Slovakia
 Lava Formation, Lithuania
 Azilal Group, North Africa
 Whitby Mudstone, England
 Fernie Formation, Alberta and British Columbia
 Poker Chip Shale
 Whiteaves Formation, British Columbia
 Navajo Sandstone, Utah
 Los Molles Formation, Argentina
 Kandreho Formation, Madagascar
 Kota Formation, India
 Cattamarra Coal Measures, Australia

References 

Geologic formations of Antarctica
Jurassic System of Antarctica
Pliensbachian Stage
Toarcian Stage
Mudstone formations
Tuff formations
Lacustrine deposits
Paleontology in Antarctica